Caversham was a parliamentary electorate in the city of Dunedin in the Otago region of New Zealand, from 1866 to 1908.

Population centres
In the 1865 electoral redistribution, the House of Representatives focussed its review of electorates to South Island electorates only, as the Central Otago Gold Rush had caused significant population growth, and a redistribution of the existing population. Fifteen additional South Island electorates were created, including Caversham, and the number of Members of Parliament was increased by 13 to 70. The Caversham electorate covered an area similar to the former  electorate. Settlements located in the electorate were the Dunedin suburb of Caversham, and Macandrew Bay, Broad Bay, and Portobello.

History

Caversham was first established in 1866 and abolished in 1890. It was recreated in 1893 and abolished again in 1908.

Arthur John Burns was the first representative, elected at the 1866 general election for the 4th New Zealand Parliament. He resigned before the end of the term in 1870. James McIndoe won the subsequent 1870 by-election, held on 25 April. He was defeated at the 1871 general election by Richard Cantrell. Cantrell resigned in the following year, and the subsequent 1872 by-election was won by William Tolmie. Before the end of the term, Tolmie died on 8 August 1875. The 20 August 1875 by-election was won by Robert Stout, who contested the City of Dunedin electorate a few months later at the 1875–76. James Seaton was successful in Caversham at that election, but he retired in 1879. William Barron represented the electorate from the 1879 general election until the seat was first abolished in 1890.

When the seat was recreated for the 1893 general election, Arthur Morrison was the successful candidate. He represented the electorate until he died on 21 November 1901. Thomas Sidey won the 1901 by-election and held the seat until it was abolished in 1908, when he was elected for the Dunedin South electorate instead.

Members of Parliament
Caversham was represented by nine Members of Parliament.

Key

Election results

1901 by-election

1899 election

1893 election

1875 by-election

1872 by-election

1871 election

1870 by-election

1866 election

Notes

References

Historical electorates of New Zealand
Politics of Dunedin
1865 establishments in New Zealand
1890 disestablishments in New Zealand
1908 disestablishments in New Zealand
1893 establishments in New Zealand